The 1951 Vermont Catamounts football team was an American football team that represented  the University of Vermont in the Yankee Conference during the 1951 college football season. In their ninth year under head coach John C. Evans, the team compiled a 0–7 record.

Schedule

References

Vermont
Vermont Catamounts football seasons
College football winless seasons
Vermont Catamounts football